Special People is a 2007 British film was directed by Justin Edgar for 104 Films. The film received widespread press coverage as a result of censorship of its disability themes.

Plot 
Enlisted to teach a class of wheelchair-users about filmmaking, the neurotic Jasper gets a little more than he bargained for. His charges seem to know more than he does about his subject; they're not impressed by his own heartfelt social realist oeuvre; and they meet his every suggestion with the blank indifference peculiar to the streetwise adolescent. Questions condescending outreach projects, self-defeating attitudes within the disabled community, and the vacuity of the film business - all with a sly wink and a healthy helping of self-parody

Cast 
Jason Maza - Dave
David Proud - Scott Swadkins
Dominic Coleman - Jasper
Sasha Hardway - Anias
Robyn Frampton - Jess
Simon Lowe - Policeman

Production 
Special People, Directed by Justin Edgar for 104 Films. Filmed on location in Birmingham UK and the Malven Hills UK.

Release 
Released on 21 November 2008 (UK) Special People attracted National press with the BBFC classifying the film as a 12A for "moderate sex references, language, violence and disability theme." Sparking criticism from cast and Disability groups that audiences should not have to be warned that a film has a disability theme.

Reception 

On Rotten Tomatoes the film has an approval rating of 89% based on reviews from 9 critics. The critical consensus states "Low budget British comedy which is sharply written and nicely acted whilst confounding disability misconceptions and prejudices on the way." 
On its release The Guardian hailed Special People as "A milestone in mainstream cinema" for its use of disabled cast. The Radio Times called it " A triumph of understated, heartfelt humour" and the Daily Mirror "A little gem".

References 

 http://www.104films.com/special-people/
 http://news.bbc.co.uk/1/hi/england/west_midlands/7748854.stm
 https://www.independent.co.uk/arts-entertainment/films/news/directors-anger-over-comedy-films-disability-warning-1020484.html
 https://www.telegraph.co.uk/news/uknews/3526522/Anger-as-film-censors-put-12A-on-film-for-containing-disabled-themes.html

External links
 

2007 films
2000s English-language films